Patrik Zackrisson (born March 27, 1987) is a professional Swedish ice hockey centre. He is currently playing for Leksands IF of the Swedish Hockey League (SHL).

Playing career
Zackrisson  spent his junior career with Frölunda HC before moving to play one season with Rögle BK in the HockeyAllsvenskan, and then signing with Linköpings HC, where he spent four seasons. Zackrisson was drafted 165th overall in the 2007 NHL Entry Draft by the San Jose Sharks.

Zackrisson scored his first goal in Elitserien on 27 September 2007 against Luleå HF. In the 2008 Swedish Championship finals against HV71 he was noted for three goals and one assist, his only points in the playoffs. In February 2009, Zackrisson signed a two-year contract with Linköping solidifying a place in the team until 2011. In 2011 Zackrisson signed a two-year contract with KHL club Atlant Moscow Oblast.

On August 20, 2013, Zackrisson signed for HC Lev Praha. After one season with Lev Praha, Zackrisson returned to Sweden and signed with Skellefteå AIK. In his two years at Skellefteå, the team reached the SHL finals twice, but did not clinch the title. In May 2016, he inked a deal with HC Lugano of the Swiss top-flight National League A (NLA).

In returning to the KHL for the 2017–18 season, Zackrisson made a quick transition to HC Sibir Novosibirsk, securing a top-line role in leading the club in scoring with 42 points in 56 games. He left as a free agent to sign a lucrative two-year contract with HC Dynamo Moscow on May 2, 2018.

After three seasons abroad, Zackrisson return home to Sweden, agreeing to a four-year contract with newly promoted Leksands IF of the SHL on 5 July 2019.

Career statistics

Regular season and playoffs

International

References

External links

1987 births
Atlant Moscow Oblast players
HC Dynamo Moscow players
Frölunda HC players
Leksands IF players
HC Lev Praha players
Linköping HC players
Living people
HC Lugano players
Ice hockey players at the 2018 Winter Olympics
Olympic ice hockey players of Sweden
Rögle BK players
San Jose Sharks draft picks
HC Sibir Novosibirsk players
Skellefteå AIK players
Swedish ice hockey centres
Swedish expatriate sportspeople in Russia
Swedish expatriate sportspeople in the Czech Republic
Swedish expatriate sportspeople in Switzerland
Swedish expatriate ice hockey people
Expatriate ice hockey players in the Czech Republic
Expatriate ice hockey players in Russia
Expatriate ice hockey players in Switzerland